Callimetopus juliae is a species of beetle in the family Cerambycidae. It was described by Barševskis in 2016.

References

Callimetopus
Beetles described in 2016